The 1923 Grand National was the 82nd renewal of the Grand National horse race that took place at Aintree Racecourse near Liverpool on 23 March 1923.

The race was won by Sergeant Murphy, a 13-year-old 100/6 shot ridden by Captain Tuppy Bennet and trained by George Blackwell for its owner Stephen Sanford, who collected the £5,000 prize for the winner.

The 1921 winner Shaun Spadah finished in second place, with Conjuror II in third and Punt Gun fourth. Twenty-eight horses ran and all returned safely to the stables. 

In attendance at Aintree were King George V, the Prince of Wales and the Duke of York. 

In 1938 a Hollywood film titled Sergeant Murphy was loosely based on the winner. Ronald Reagan starred as the owner of the horse in the film.

Finishing Order

Non-finishers

References

 1923
Grand National
Grand National
20th century in Lancashire